Akula Satyanarayana is an Indian politician who is a member of the YSR Congress Party from Andhra Pradesh and former member of Bharatiya Janata Party. He has won the 2014 Andhra Pradesh Legislative Assembly election from Rajahmundry City.

He won with 79,531 votes in Assembly Election in East Godavari by a margin of 26,377 compared to his political rival Bommana Raj Kumar of YSR Congress Party. He studied in  APRJC Nagarjunasagar.

References

Living people
Politicians from Rajahmundry
Bharatiya Janata Party politicians from Andhra Pradesh
Telugu politicians
Jana Sena Party politicians
Andhra Pradesh MLAs 2014–2019
Year of birth missing (living people)
YSR Congress Party politicians